Barelli is a comics series featuring an eponymous character, created by Bob de Moor, which first appeared in the Franco-Belgian comics magazine Tintin on July 27, 1950. Barelli made sporadic serial runs throughout the 1950s, 1960s and 1970s while 8 albums in the series were released by Lombard and Bédescope.

Synopsis
Barelli is a theatre actor who often finds himself caught up in dangerous adventures.

Bibliography

Serialised stories
 L'enigmatique monsieur Barelli (Tintin, 30/1950 - 9/1951)
 Barelli a nusa penida (Tintin, 10/1951 - 20/1952. Later Bob de Moor added pages to this adventure)
 Barelli et les agents secrets (Tintin, 1964)
 Barelli et le Bouddha boudant (Tintin, 1972)
 Bonne mine à la mer (Tintin, 1974)
 Barelli et le seigneur de Gonobutz (Tintin, 1976)
 Barelli et la mort de Richard II (1980)

Album publications
L'énigmatique Mr Barelli (1956) Lombard
Barelli et les agents secrets (1973), Lombard
Barelli et le bouddha boudant (1974), Lombard
Bonne mine à la mer (1975), Lombard
Barelli à Nusa Penida T1 (1980), Bédescope
Barelli à Nusa Penida T2 (1980), Bédescope
Le Seigneur de Gonobutz (1980), Bedescope
Barelli et la mort de Richard II (1980), Bedescope

 Bruxelles Bouillonne (1990) Promotional comic book for the city of Brussels.

Sources

 Barelli publications in Belgian Tintin and French Tintin BDoubliées 
 Barelli albums Bedetheque 

Footnotes

Belgian comic strips
1950 comics debuts
Comics characters introduced in 1950
Male characters in comics
1980 comics endings
Fictional actors
Humor comics
Adventure comics
Belgian comics characters
Lombard Editions titles
Comics by Bob de Moor